James Flatley may refer to:

 James H. Flatley (1906–1958), United States Navy aviator and tactician
 James H. Flatley III, his son, United States Navy admiral